Sicuani District is one of eight districts of the province Canchis in Peru.

Geography 
The most important river is the Willkanuta which crosses the district from southeast to northwest.

Some of the highest mountains of the district are listed below:

See also 
 Saqaqaniqucha

References